Musallam is a name of Arabic origin.

People with the name 

 Musallam Al-Barrak (born 1956), Kuwaiti politician
 Sara Musallam, Emirati businesswoman and politician
 Musallam bin Nufl, Omani politician
 Musallam Bseiso (1926-2017), Palestinian journalist

See also 

 Musaylima

Given names
Surnames
Arabic given names
Arabic-language surnames